Karkuvel Ayyanar Temple is a Hindu temple in a village named Kuthiraimozhi in Thoothukudi, in the Indian state of Tamil Nadu.  The temple is 500–1,000 years old. The temple is surrounded by a red sand desert with many cashew and palm trees. This is the only desert found in south India.

Location

Deities
It is said that the presiding deity of the Ayyanar has come from a tree known as Karkuva. He is also called Karkuva Ayyan, Karku Velappan, Karukkuvalai Ayyan, and Karkuvel Ayyanar, among other names. He is found with his consorts, goddess Poornam and goddess Porkamalam, in a sitting posture. There are also separate shrines for other deities. Other Gods there include Periyandavar, Udhiramadan, Malayamman, Ivar Raja, Vanniya Raja, Vannichi, Pechiyamman, Ponirulapar, Kallar Sami, SolkelaVeeran Thuppakki Madan, and Sarvasakthi Amman.

Kallar Vettu
The main festival of this temple is Kallar Vettu ('Killing of Robber'). It is celebrated every year on the last five days of Tamil month Karthigai (mid-November to mid-December) and the first day of Tamil month Margazhi (mid-December to mid-January). The sixth day festival is celebrated in a grand manner. On that day during morning taking of milk pot and taking holy water from Thamirabarani River took place. The holy water placed on the elephant would be brought. Later Mulaippari is taken. By 12.00 noon special pujas are held. On that day, by 4.00 p.m. 'Kallar Vettu' took place. At that time tender cocoanut, considered as Kallar, is broken in the rear side of the temple. The cocoanut water which came from it is considered as holy water. The devotees, took the sand on which the cocoanut water, spray it in their field for bounty yield. Some keep them in their cash box. It is considered as auspicious and would bring them wealth.

Due to this God, no theft occurs around this village. Several lakhs of people gather there to celebrate. Villu Pattu (bow song) about the Praise of Karguvel Ayyanar is another attraction. At that time Konar (Yadavar) caste people perform the Kallar Vettu. Palayamkottai, Thachanallur, Valliyoor Yadava (Konar) Pattaraikararkal start the festival by conducting the Ivaraja puja and the festival time they conduct the Munnadian puja. Temple puja are performed three times daily. The people of the Nadar community built the auditorium.

Kumbhabhishekham 
The latest Kumbhabhishekam of this temple was held on 1 September 2022. From an inscription found in this temple it is learnt that previous Kumbhabhishekam was held on 31 October 2008.

References

External links 
Official website
Dinamalar

Regional Hindu gods
Hindu temples in Thoothukudi district